Dagobert Peche (3 April 1887, Sankt Michael/Lungau, Land Salzburg – 16 April 1923, Modling) was an Austrian artist and metalworker designer.

Career

He joined the Wiener Werkstätte in 1915 and exhibited at Deutscher Werkbund Exhibition in Cologne and then became a co-director thereof in 1916. Whilst there in the early 1920s he introduced a 'spiky baroque' style inspired by folk-art, and using flowers, animals and human figures as decorative motifs.

References

External links
 An example of Dagobert Peche's work
 Biographical sketch of Peche with examples of his work

1887 births
1923 deaths
People from Tamsweg District
Austrian artists
Wiener Werkstätte